The Strange Case Of... is the second studio album by American rock band Halestorm. It was released on April 10, 2012 by Atlantic. The album was produced by Howard Benson, who also produced the band's self-titled debut album. The first single and video from the album "Love Bites (So Do I)" won a Grammy Award for Best Hard Rock/Metal Performance. The song "Freak Like Me" was the band's first single to reach number one on the Mainstream Rock chart. The song "Here's to Us" was performed on the US television show, Glee, with clean lyrics. Four of the album's songs were previously released on the sneak-preview EP Hello, It's Mz. Hyde. A deluxe edition of the album was also released containing three bonus tracks. A different version of the song "Here's to Us" featuring multiple guests including Slash was included as a bonus track on the reissue version of the standard and deluxe version of the album in 2013.
In interviews about the album, Hale noted that the album was heavier than their previous album, but was significantly closer to the sound of them live.

The album debuted at No. 7 on Top Rock Albums and No. 15 on the Billboard 200, selling 24,000 copies in its first week.  It has sold 1,000,000 copies in the US as of June 2, 2022, certified by the RIAA.

Track listing

Hello, It's Mz. Hyde EP
The band released an EP before the album release of four of the songs set to appear on The Strange Case Of....

Personnel
Credits adapted from the liner notes of The Strange Case Of....

Band members
 Lzzy Hale – lead vocals, rhythm guitar, piano
 Joe Hottinger – lead guitar, backing vocals
 Josh Smith – bass guitar, backing vocals
 Arejay Hale – drums, percussion, backing vocals

Additional personnel

Musicians
 Wolfgang Van Halen – background vocals
 Myles Kennedy – guitar
 Slash – guitar
 Phil X – guitar
 Howard Benson – keyboards
 Lenny Skolnik – keyboards
 Jamie Muhoberac – piano
 Maria Brink – background vocals
 Tyler Connolly – background vocals
 David Draiman – background vocals
 Myles Kennedy – background vocals
 James Michael – background vocals
 Brent Smith – background vocals

Artistry
 Alex Kirzhner – art direction, design, photography
 Hikari Tezuka – hair stylist
 Lucky Smyler – make-up
 Chris Phelps – photography
 Mody Al Khufash – stylist

Production

 Anne Declemente – A&R, administration
 Pete Ganbarg – A&R
 Paul DeCarli – digital editing, engineer
 Jon Nicholson – drum technician
 Jimmy Fahey – engineer
 Hatsukazu "Hatch" Inagaki – engineer
 James Michael – engineer
  Mike Plotnikoff – engineer
 Marc VanGool – guitar technician
 Ted Jensen – mastering
 Chris Lord-Alge – mixing
 Brian Ranney – packaging
 Howard Benson – producer, programming
 Lenny Skolnik – programming

Charts

Weekly charts

Year-end charts

Certifications

References

2012 albums
Halestorm albums
Atlantic Records albums
Albums produced by Howard Benson